The 1972 Cal Poly Mustangs football team represented California Polytechnic State University, San Luis Obispo as a member of the California Collegiate Athletic Association (CCAA) during the 1972 NCAA College Division football season. Led by fifth-year head coach Joe Harper, Cal Poly compiled an overall record of 8–1–1 with a mark of 3–0 in conference play, sharing the CCAA title with UC Riverside and winning a conference championship for the fourth consecutive season. Cal Poly was invited to the NCAA College Division western region playoff game, the Camellia Bowl, held in Sacramento, California. The Mustangs played North Dakota on December 10, losing 38–21. Cal Poly was ranked No. 3 in the final College Division rankings. The Mustangs played home games at Mustang Stadium in San Luis Obispo, California.

Schedule

References

Cal Poly
Cal Poly Mustangs football seasons
California Collegiate Athletic Association football champion seasons
Cal Poly Mustangs football